Henri Mveh (born 18 March 1951) is a Cameroonian cyclist. He competed in the team time trial event at the 1976 Summer Olympics.

References

External links
 

1951 births
Living people
Cameroonian male cyclists
Olympic cyclists of Cameroon
Cyclists at the 1976 Summer Olympics
Place of birth missing (living people)